is a railway station in the city of Inazawa, Aichi Prefecture, Japan, operated by Meitetsu.

Lines

Station layout
The station has a single side platform, which can serve trains of up to six carriages, and is used with services which terminate at the station. Morikami Station also has a shorter island platform, which can serve trains of up to four carriages in length.   The station has automated ticket machines, Manaca automated turnstiles and is staffed.

Platforms

Adjacent stations

|-
!colspan=5|Meitetsu

Station history
Morikami Station was opened on February 17, 1899 as a station on the privately held Bisai Railroad, which was purchased by Meitetsu on August 1, 1925 becoming the Meitetsu Bisai Line. A new station building was completed in 2007.

Passenger statistics
In fiscal 2017, the station was used by an average of 3,194 passengers daily.

Surrounding area
former Sobue town hall
Kyowa High School

See also
 List of Railway Stations in Japan

References

External links

 Official web page 

Railway stations in Japan opened in 1899
Railway stations in Aichi Prefecture
Stations of Nagoya Railroad
Inazawa